A Heartbeat Away is a 2011 Australian musical comedy film about a marching band in a small town.

Plot
A young man with high aspirations as a musician steps up to become the musical director of the local marching band after his father is hurt in a vehicle accident. He has four weeks to drill the band before a major competition.

Cast

 Sebastian Gregory	-	Kevin Flack
 Isabel Lucas	-	Mandy Riddick
 William Zappa	-	Edwin Flack
 Tammy Macintosh	-	Grace Flack
 Colin Friels	-	Mayor Riddick
 Roy Billing	-	George
 Kerry Walker	-	Dawn
 Terry Camilleri-	Gino
 Errol O'Neill	-	Derek

Production
Filming started in March 2010. The film was financed by Screen Australia, Screen Queensland, Cutting Edge Pty Ltd and Quickfire Films (UK).

Reception
The film was a box office disappointment, widely considered a commercial and critical flop. During its opening weekend it took $44,204 across 77 screens, giving it a screen average of just $574.

References

External links
A Heartbeat Away at At the Movies
Review at The Age
Trailer

Australian musical comedy films
2011 films
Films scored by Guy Gross
2010s English-language films
2010s Australian films